Mandy Cunningham (born 11 June 1964) is a lawn bowler from Northern Ireland.

Bowls career
In 2005 she won the fours bronze medal at the Atlantic Bowls Championships and four years later she won the fours bronze medal at the 2009 Atlantic Championships.

She competed for Northern Ireland in the women's pairs event at the 2014 Commonwealth Games where she won a bronze medal.

She won the 2011 and 2013 singles title at the Irish National Bowls Championships bowling for the Ewarts Bowls Club. After the 2013 success she subsequently won the singles at the British Isles Bowls Championships in 2014.

References

1964 births
Living people
Bowls players at the 2010 Commonwealth Games
Bowls players at the 2014 Commonwealth Games
Commonwealth Games bronze medallists for Northern Ireland
Sportspeople from Belfast
Female lawn bowls players from Northern Ireland
Commonwealth Games medallists in lawn bowls
Medallists at the 2014 Commonwealth Games